Fairmont (1040 East) is a streetcar stop in the Sugar House neighborhood of Salt Lake City, Utah, served by Utah Transit Authority's (UTA) S Line (previously known as the Sugar House Streetcar). The S Line provides service from this station to the city of South Salt Lake (where it connects with UTA's TRAX light rail system).

Description 
The Fairmont stop (previously referred to as McClelland) is located at 2216 South McClelland Street (1040 East), immediately west of McClelland Street on the north side of Sugarmont Drive. The stop is on the southwest corner of the Granite Block. Just west of this stop the single set of tracks diverges to form another passing track at this stop, however the track do not yet merge heading east since the tracks end at the stop. The two side platforms are located on the far north and south sides tracks. There is very limited street side parking possible nearby, as well as possibly at Fairmont Park. The stop began service on December 8, 2013, and is operated by Utah Transit Authority.

The Fairmont stop is eastern terminus of Phase 1 of the S Line.  In Phase 2, the S Line will continue east to Highland Drive and then head north on that street. It will continue heading north (as Highland Drive becomes South 1100 East at 2100 South) to end at 1700 South on South 1100 East (just west of the campus of Westminster College).

References 

UTA streetcar stops
Railway stations in the United States opened in 2013
Railway stations in Salt Lake City
2013 establishments in Utah